Spokane Airport may refer to:
Spokane International Airport, international airport
Felts Field, public use airport